Goniobranchus geometricus is a species of colourful sea slug, a dorid nudibranch, a marine gastropod mollusc in the family Chromodorididae.

Distribution
This species was described from New Caledonia.

Description
Goniobranchus geometricus is a small nudibranch which may grow to a total length of 35mm. It is variably coloured, with the ground colour ranging from a creamy brown to purple, The mantle has numerous cream-coloured bumps and has a white margin. The gills and rhinophores are white to greenish. It is very similar to Goniobranchus conchyliatus but has green-grey rhinophores and gills whilst G. conchyliatus has red ones.

Ecology
This animal feeds on the sponge ''Chelonaplysilla violacea.

References

External links
 

Chromodorididae
Gastropods described in 1928